Pune has emerged to be the largest metropolitan city of India in the state of Maharashtra. The Eastern and Western Metropolitan Corridor of the city is witnessing a boom in the high-rise sector, with many high-rises already made and many under construction. Currently Amanora Gateway Towers is the tallest buildings in Pune with 45 floors.

Tallest buildings
This list ranks buildings in Pune that stand at least , based on standard height measurement or are 25 floors tall. This includes spires and architectural details but does not include antenna masts. Only completed buildings and under-construction buildings that have been topped out are included.

Tallest under construction
This lists ranks the 19 buildings that are under construction in pune and are planned to rise at least  or 40 floors tall. Proposed buildings are not included in this table.

See also

 List of tallest buildings in India

References

Pune
Buildings
Buildings and structures in Pune
Tallest buildings in Pune